Mircekiraz is a village in the Gerede District, Bolu Province, Turkey. Its population is 93 (2021). Mircekiraz is approximately 326 km from Istanbul.

References

Villages in Gerede District